Midway Stadium was the name of two different minor league baseball parks in Saint Paul, Minnesota, United States, both now demolished. The name derived from the location of the stadium in St. Paul's Midway area, so named because it is roughly halfway between the downtowns of Minneapolis and Saint Paul.

The first Midway Stadium was the home of the St. Paul Saints of the American Association from 1957–1960. It was located at 1000 North Snelling Avenue, on the east side of that street. It was built with just a small uncovered and presumably expandable grandstand. It was intended to compete with Metropolitan Stadium for attracting a major league baseball team, but the already-larger capacity of "The Met" doomed Midway Stadium. It was abandoned for professional baseball once the Twins arrived in 1961 and displaced both the Saints and the Minneapolis Millers. It was used for by the Minnesota Norsemen professional softball team of the American Professional Slow Pitch Softball League (APSPL) for their 1977-1979 seasons.  It was also used as a Minnesota Vikings practice field for the next 20 years, and finally demolished in 1981 to make way for the Energy Park. That development, with all new streets and various buildings, rubbed out any trace of the ballpark's existence.

The second Midway Stadium was built in 1982 at roughly half the size of its namesake. It was located at 1771 Energy Park Drive. That's on the north side of that road, just west of Snelling, complemented by the Burlington Northern tracks to the north just beyond left field. Thus it was about a mile west of the first Midway Stadium site. The ballpark started out in life as Municipal Stadium. It was home of Hamline University's baseball team. Despite its baseball configurations, some small private schools in St. Paul played football games at Midway in the fall.  When Mike Veeck and Bill Murray revived the Saints and also the independent Northern League in 1993, they set up shop there, at the soon-rechristened Midway Stadium. Midway Stadium was also used, occasionally, for rock concerts and other events.  In April 2014 it was announced that pioneering alternative rock band The Replacements would hold a hometown reunion concert at the venue on September 13, 2014.

The Saints' slogan is "Fun Is Good" and Mike Veeck has proudly declared that Midway Stadium is "The ugliest ballpark in America!"  Mike's late father, Bill Veeck, Jr. is a well-known baseball owner and counts one of his accomplishments as planting the ivy at Wrigley Field.

2014 was the final season for both Hamline and the Saints at Midway Stadium. Both teams moved into the new ballpark CHS Field in time for the 2015 season. Midway Stadium was torn down in 2015. The 12-acre site will be used for an office or warehouse development, which is in line with the industrial area that surrounds the stadium.

Dimensions
Midway Stadium (I)
Seating capacity – 10,250
Left Field – .
Left Center Field – .
Center Field – .
Right Center Field – .
Right Field – .

Midway Stadium (II)
Seating capacity – 6,069
Left Field – .
Center Field – .
Right Field – .

References

External links 
Midway Stadium page on St. Paul Parks & Recreation website
Visit to Midway Stadium
Official Saints Website
Stew Thornley's info about old Twin Cities ballparks
Midway Stadium Hamline University

Baseball venues in Minnesota
Sports venues demolished in 1981
Defunct baseball venues in the United States
Minor league baseball venues
Sports venues in Saint Paul, Minnesota
1981 disestablishments in Minnesota
1982 establishments in Minnesota
2015 disestablishments in Minnesota
Sports venues completed in 1982
Sports venues demolished in 2015
Demolished sports venues in Minnesota